The 1990 FIBA World Championship was the 11th FIBA World Championship, the international basketball world championship for men's teams. It was hosted by Argentina from 8 to 19 August 1990. The final phase of the competition was held at the Luna Park, Buenos Aires.

Yugoslavia emerged as the tournament winner. This was the last World Championship in which the country participated before  its dissolution. Likewise, the Soviet Union participated in its final tournament before its dissolution.

This was the first ever FIBA World Championship (now called FIBA Basketball World Cup) tournament, in which non-American current NBA players that had also already played in an official regular season NBA game could participate.

Venues

Qualification
There were 16 teams taking part in the 1990 World Cup of Basketball. 

 Host nation: 1 berth
 FIBA Americas: 12 teams competing for 5 berths
 FIBA Europe: 8 teams competing for 5 berths
 FIBA Oceania: 2 teams competing for 1 berths
 FIBA Asia: 15 teams competing for 2 berths
 FIBA Africa: 11 teams competing for 2 berths

Qualified teams

Draw

Preliminary round

Group A

Group B

Group C

Group D

Quarterfinal round
The top two finishers from Groups I and II advance to the final round.

Group I

Group II

9th–16th classification

Quarterfinal round

Group III

Group IV

13th–16th classification

Semifinals

Fifteenth place playoff

Thirteenth place playoff

9th–12th classification

Semifinals

Eleventh place playoff

Ninth place playoff

5th–8th classification

Semifinals

Seventh place playoff

Fifth place playoff

Final round

Semifinals

Third place playoff

Final

Final rankings

Awards 

Team Roster:
Dražen Petrović, Velimir Perasović, Zoran Čutura, Toni Kukoč, Žarko Paspalj, Jure Zdovc, Željko Obradović, Radisav Ćurčić, Vlade Divac, Arijan Komazec, Zoran Jovanović, and Zoran Savić.
Head coach: Dušan Ivković

All-Tournament Team

 Oscar Schmidt (Brazil)
 Toni Kukoč (Yugoslavia)
 Vlade Divac (Yugoslavia)
 Kenny Anderson (USA)
 Fico López (Puerto Rico)

Top scorers (ppg)

 Oscar Schmidt (Brazil) 34.6
 Antonello Riva (Italy) 30.3
 Panagiotis Giannakis (Greece) 26.0
 Andrew Gaze (Australia) 24.3
 Jordi Villacampa (Spain) 23.0
 Kim Kim (S.Korea) 22.1
 Gabriel Estaba (Venezuela) 21.5
 Wang Fei (China) 19.4
 Kenny Anderson (USA) 18.8
 Valeri Tikhonenko (USSR) 18.5

References

External links
 
 

 
1990
International basketball competitions hosted by Argentina
1990
1990 in basketball
1990 in Argentine sport
1990s in Buenos Aires
Sport in Córdoba, Argentina
Sport in Rosario, Santa Fe
Sport in Salta Province